Libyan Wings Airlines Co JSC, or Libyan Wings, is an airline with its head office on the grounds of Mitiga International Airport in Tripoli, Libya. It started operations in September 2015 after facing delays because of political instability in Libya. As of January 2020, the airline operates four Airbus A319s to four destinations in Libya, Tunisia and Turkey.

History

In June 2013, ch-aviation reported that Libyan Wings intended to start operations in November of that year. In November 2013, the airline signed a memorandum of understanding with Airbus for three Airbus A350-900s and four Airbus A320neos; the anticipated launch date was shifted to early 2014. In May 2014, Libyan Wings signed to lease two Airbus A319s from a Dubai-based company, planning to begin flights later in the year. However, because of the deteriorating political situation in Libya, the airline had to delay its launch further. While it waited for conditions to improve, Libyan Wings retained its Airbus A319s rather than return them to the lessor, even though this action was costly.

In order to obtain its air operator's certificate, the airline had to conduct a proving flight with passengers. Because Tripoli was still unsafe, Libyan Wings operated its proving flight in Turkey with Libyan Civil Aviation Authority officials on board. The airline commenced operations on 21 September 2015 with a flight from Tripoli to Istanbul.

Flights to Tunis began in October 2015, and Istanbul operations have since resumed. As of October 2016, the memorandum of understanding with Airbus is still in effect, although the order has not been finalised yet.

Corporate affairs
Libyan Wings is headquartered in Tripoli, and its chief executive officer is Mohammed madi. The airline has at least ten investors. As of November 2016, the airline has between 120 and 130 employees. The majority of customers are Libyan citizens and are travelling for business purposes.

Destinations
As of August 2022, Libyan Wings operates scheduled flights to the destinations:

Libya
Tripoli - Mitiga International Airport base
Misrata - Misrata International Airport

Sebha
Tunisia
Tunis - Tunis–Carthage International Airport

Turkey
Istanbul - Istanbul Airport

Fleet

, Libyan Wings operates the following aircraft:

Notes

References

External links

 

Airlines of Libya
Airlines established in 2015
Organizations based in Tripoli, Libya
2015 establishments in Libya
Economy of Tripoli, Libya